Julian Dorio (born November 26, 1981) is an American drummer. He is a founding member of the rock band The Whigs.

Biography
Julian started drumming at the age of 6, as an original member of the Flying Dorios.  The band included his father and his older brother, Michael Dorio of Trances Arc.  A high school graduate of The Westminster Schools in Atlanta and a college graduate of the University of Georgia, Dorio currently resides in Nashville, Tennessee. 

The Whigs was signed to their current record label, Dave Matthews' ATO, in 2006. He has been featured in Drum Magazine and Modern Drummer.  The Whigs were also invited to perform on the Late Show with David Letterman on January 28, 2008, and Late Night with Conan O'Brien on February 20, 2008.

Career
Julian is the drummer for, and a founding member of, The Whigs, a garage rock band out of Athens, Georgia. 

In March 2007, Julian Dorio was awarded an Esky award for "Best Drummer" by Esquire magazine.

In the fall of 2015, Dorio briefly toured with Eagles of Death Metal. He was drumming for band at the Bataclan theatre in Paris during the terrorist attacks in November 2015. All band members survived the attacks.

References

American rock musicians
Living people
1981 births
Musicians from Atlanta
University of Georgia alumni
Survivors of terrorist attacks
November 2015 Paris attacks
The Westminster Schools alumni
Eagles of Death Metal members